Josef "Jupp" Nehl (born 13 June 1961) is a retired German football player.

Career

Statistics

References

External links
 

1961 births
Living people
German footballers
Bundesliga players
VfL Bochum players
Bayer 04 Leverkusen players
FC Viktoria Köln players

Association football midfielders
Footballers from Cologne